Sree Dhanya Catering Service is a 2022 Malayalam comedy drama film written and directed by Jeo Baby.

Plot
It all happens over two days, and the evening/night in between. Friends gather in a house to help cook biryani, for a baby's birthday lunch. Who shows up to help, how they gather around, and how the spend the night forms the story line.

Cast

Production

Release
Speaking to the press before the release, the director Jeo Baby stated "Sreedhanya Catering Service’: It’s about men cooking, and everything that is brewing".

Reception
Indian Express Malayalam reviewed the movie, praising the realistic scenes, fun, and music, but critiqued its content as insufficient for a feature film.

References

External links
 

2020s Malayalam-language films
Indian drama films
2022 films